Ghatsa is a genus of ray-finned fish in the family Balitoridae. This genus is created for species previously assigned to Homaloptera from the Western Ghats of India.

Species
There are currently 5 recognized species in this genus:
 Ghatsa menoni Shaji & Easa, 1995   
 Ghatsa montana Herre, 1945 (Anamalai loach)   
 Ghatsa pillaii Indra & Rema Devi, 1981 (Silent Valley loach)   
 Ghatsa santhamparaiensis Arunachalam, J. A. Johnson & Rema Devi, 2002 (Santhampara loach)   
 Ghatsa silasi Kurup & Radhakrishnan, 2011

References

Balitoridae
Taxa named by Lawrence M. Page